A pituitary disease is a disorder primarily affecting the pituitary gland.


Table
The main disorders involving the pituitary gland are:

Overproduction or underproduction of a pituitary hormone will affect the respective end-organ. For example, insufficient production (hyposecretion) of thyroid stimulating hormone (TSH) in the pituitary gland will cause hypothyroidism, while overproduction (hypersecretion) of TSH will cause hyperthyroidism. Thyroidisms caused by the pituitary gland are less common though, accounting for less than 10% of all hypothyroidism cases and much less than 1% of hyperthyroidism cases.

See also
 Hypophysitis, inflammation of the pituitary gland.
 Autoimmune hypophysitis (or lymphocytic hypophysitis), inflammation of the pituitary gland due to autoimmunity.
 Pituitary tumour, a tumor of the pituitary gland.
 Pituitary adenoma, a noncancerous tumor of the pituitary gland.
 Pituicytoma, a rare brain tumor.
 Pituitary apoplexy, bleeding into or impaired blood supply of the pituitary gland.

References

External links 

Endocrine system